Osvaldo César Ardiles (born 3 August 1952), often referred to in Britain as Ossie Ardiles, is an Argentine football manager, pundit and former midfielder who won the 1978 FIFA World Cup as part of the Argentina national team. He now runs his own football school in the UK called the Ossie Ardiles Soccer School.

A competitive and skilled midfielder, Ardiles became a cult hero in England, along with Glenn Hoddle and compatriot Ricardo Villa, as a player for Tottenham Hotspur. He left England for a period on loan as a result of the outbreak of the Falklands War in 1982, thus missing most of the 1982–83 English season.

After retirement, Ardiles began his management career in England, coaching Swindon Town, Newcastle United and West Bromwich Albion, before returning to Tottenham to become the first Premier League manager from Argentina. As manager of Spurs in the mid-1990s, he played several matches utilizing a formation that had five forwards, a formation that had not been used in English football since the 1950s. During his career, Ardiles has also coached in Mexico, Croatia, Japan, Syria, Saudi Arabia, Malaysia, Paraguay and his native Argentina.

In Ireland, he is a pundit for RTÉ Sport.

Club career
Ardiles was born in Córdoba, and played for Instituto de Córdoba from a young age. As a youngster, Ardiles played football in the streets and was given the nickname Pitón (python) by his brother because of his snake-like dribbling skills.  He was named as El Gráfico's best player of the interior in 1974, and abandoned his law degree studies in order to play professional football.

He also played for Club Atlético Belgrano and Huracán. After the 1978 World Cup he moved to England to play for Tottenham Hotspur where he spent ten seasons.

He helped Tottenham win the FA Cup in his third season there (1980–81), and collaborated with pop duo Chas & Dave as well as the rest of the Tottenham players for a song, "Ossie's Dream". He played a big part in another FA Cup triumph the following year, but did not play in the final because it had already been arranged with the Spurs management that he would leave early to join up with Argentina's 1982 World Cup squad. At that tournament he wore the number 1 shirt, as Argentina's policy at the time was to number their players alphabetically by surname, with an exception made so Diego Maradona could wear his preferred number 10.

In the wake of the Falklands War between Britain and Argentina it became difficult for him to return to White Hart Lane and he went on loan to Paris Saint-Germain in France. After one season in Paris, he returned to Tottenham, helping the club to win the UEFA Cup in 1984 (coming on as a substitute in the second leg of the final). In the autumn of 1987, he was caretaker coach under caretaker manager Doug Livermore of Tottenham between the resignation of David Pleat and the appointment of Terry Venables. Ardiles left Spurs in 1988.
He then played for Blackburn Rovers, Queens Park Rangers and Swindon Town, before being appointed as manager of Swindon Town in July 1989. He played part of the 1989 American Soccer League season with the Fort Lauderdale Strikers.

On 7 February 2008, Ardiles, along with his fellow countryman Ricardo Villa, was inducted into the Tottenham Hotspur Hall of Fame.

International career
Ardiles was called up to the Argentina senior team by manager César Luis Menotti in 1975.
He was a member of the World Cup winning squad in 1978.

Management career 

In July 1989, Ardiles moved into football management with second division Swindon Town when Lou Macari resigned to join West Ham in July 1989. He wowed fans by replacing the long ball style which had been so successful with a new "Samba style", which saw the Town playing attacking football. Part of this change was the new "diamond formation" which Ardiles implemented: a 4–4–2 style with left-sided, right-sided, attacking and defensive midfielders.

Ten months after he had joined, Ardiles led Swindon to their highest ever league position, finishing fourth in the second division. After beating Blackburn in the first leg of the play-off semi-final, the fans paid tribute with a tickertape reception in the second leg. Swindon went on to win promotion to the top flight for the first time in their history—beating Sunderland in the Play-Off Final—only to have the promotion taken from them ten days later, when the Football League demoted them for irregular payments to players.

The following season, Ardiles was told to sell players to keep the club alive and Wembley hero Alan McLoughlin was the first big-money departure. With Swindon rocked by their pre-season troubles, their form deserted them. By the end of February, relegation threatened, and when Newcastle offered Ardiles the chance to become their new boss, he accepted, becoming the club's first foreign manager. But his time on Tyneside was not a success and he lasted 12 months in the job before being sacked, with the Magpies bottom of the second division, though they achieved safety under his successor Kevin Keegan.

In June 1992 Ardiles replaced Bobby Gould as manager of West Bromwich Albion, who had just missed out on the third division playoffs in 1991–92. At the end of the 1992–93 season, Ardiles guided Albion to victory over Port Vale in the Division Two playoff final. Shortly afterwards he walked out of the Hawthorns to return his former club Tottenham as manager, but his management spell was nowhere near as successful as his spell as a player. Tottenham finished 15th in the Premiership and despite the expensive acquisition of Jürgen Klinsmann and Ilie Dumitrescu in the 1994 close season, Ardiles was sacked in October 1994 with Tottenham languishing in the bottom half of the Premier League. They had just been punished for financial irregularities committed during the late 1980s: with a 1-year FA Cup ban, £600,000 fine and 12 league points deducted. The punishment was later amended to a £1.5million fine and six points deducted but the FA Cup ban and points deduction were later quashed.

Ardiles became coach of J. League Division 1 side Yokohama F. Marinos in January 2000, but was sacked in June 2001 following a poor start to the season. From 2003 to 2005 he coached Tokyo Verdy, with whom he won the 2004 Emperor's Cup, In July 2005 Ardiles was fired after a nine-game winless streak. In mid-2006 he moved to Israel to coach Beitar Jerusalem, from which he quit after only a few months in charge on 18 October 2006 due to severe differences of opinion with the club's board of directors. After a small break he was appointed Club Atlético Huracán manager in his native Argentina in September 2007, he steered the club to 7th in the table before resigning at the end of the Apertura 2007.

He joined Paraguayan club Cerro Porteño in May 2008 but was sacked in August of the same year after a string of poor results and was replaced by Pedro Troglio.

Media career 
Ardiles was enlisted by RTÉ Sport for their squad of pundits ahead of the 2010 FIFA World Cup in South Africa. He returned to RTÉ's team for the 2014 FIFA World Cup in Brazil.

Ardiles played Carlos Rey in the 1981 World War II film Escape to Victory.

Personal life
He married fellow Argentine Silvia Navarro in December 1973.

In January 2014, Ardiles and Ricardo Villa were involved in a car crash in the Falkland Islands during the filming of Camilo Antolini's 30 for 30 documentary White, Blue and White. Ardiles sustained minor injuries in the accident, and required more than 20 stitches in his head.

Career statistics

Club

International

Managerial statistics

Honours

Player
Tottenham Hotspur
 FA Cup: 1980–81, 1981–82
 FA Charity Shield: 1981 (shared) 
 UEFA Cup: 1983–84

Argentina
 FIFA World Cup: 1978

Individual
 Football League 100 Legends list (as the only Argentinian)
 Football League First Division PFA Team of the Year: 1979
 Golden Foot: 2013

Manager
Swindon Town
 Promotion to Division One: 1990

West Bromwich Albion
 Promotion to Division One: 1993

Shimizu S-Pulse
 Nabisco Cup: 1996

Yokohama F. Marinos
 J-League first stage: 2000

Tokyo Verdy
 Emperor's Cup: 2004–05

Individual
 J. League Manager of the Year: 1998

References
Specific

General

External links

 
 
 
 
 Profile and Statistics at Futbolistasblogspotcom.blogspot.com 
  

Living people
1952 births
Sportspeople from Córdoba Province, Argentina
Argentine footballers
Association football midfielders
Argentina international footballers
FIFA World Cup-winning players
1978 FIFA World Cup players
1982 FIFA World Cup players
1975 Copa América players
Argentine Primera División players
English Football League players
Ligue 1 players
National Soccer League (Australia) players
American Soccer League (1988–89) players
Instituto footballers
Club Atlético Belgrano footballers
Club Atlético Huracán footballers
Tottenham Hotspur F.C. players
Paris Saint-Germain F.C. players
Blackburn Rovers F.C. players
Queens Park Rangers F.C. players
Fort Lauderdale Strikers (1988–1994) players
Swindon Town F.C. players
UEFA Cup winning players
Argentine football managers
Premier League managers
Israeli Premier League managers
J1 League managers
J2 League managers
Swindon Town F.C. managers
Newcastle United F.C. managers
West Bromwich Albion F.C. managers
Tottenham Hotspur F.C. managers
C.D. Guadalajara managers
Shimizu S-Pulse managers
GNK Dinamo Zagreb managers
Yokohama F. Marinos managers
Ittihad FC managers
Racing Club de Avellaneda managers
Tokyo Verdy managers
Beitar Jerusalem F.C. managers
Club Atlético Huracán managers
Cerro Porteño managers
FC Machida Zelvia managers
English Football Hall of Fame inductees
Argentine expatriate footballers
Argentine expatriate football managers
Argentine expatriate sportspeople in England
Expatriate football managers in England
Argentine expatriate sportspeople in France
Expatriate footballers in France
Argentine expatriate sportspeople in Australia
Expatriate soccer players in Australia
Argentine expatriate sportspeople in Mexico
Expatriate football managers in Mexico
Argentine expatriate sportspeople in Japan
Expatriate football managers in Japan
Argentine expatriate sportspeople in Croatia
Expatriate football managers in Croatia
Expatriate football managers in Syria
Argentine expatriate sportspeople in Syria
Argentine expatriate sportspeople in Israel
Expatriate football managers in Israel
Argentine expatriate sportspeople in Paraguay
Expatriate football managers in Paraguay
FA Cup Final players